Skyjack or variation may refer to:

 A skyjack, an incidence of aircraft hijacking
 SkyJack, a UAV drone
 Sky Jack, a thoroughbred racehorse
 Skyjack (Transformers), a fictional robot
 Skyjacks, a fictional group from the Revelation Space fictional universe

See also

 
 
 Skyjacker (disambiguation)
 Skyjacked (disambiguation)
 Hijack
 Sky (disambiguation)
 Jack (disambiguation)
 Sky pirate (disambiguation)
 Air pirate (disambiguation)